The Ellas-McKay House is a historic house at 404 North Wells Street in Clarendon, Arkansas.  It is a two-story wood-frame structure, with a hip roof and the irregular and asymmetrical massing typical of the Queen Anne period.  The left side of the front facade has a clipped-gable projection, while the right side has a semi-circular porch with an engaged gable dormer above.  Both of these gables have decorative barge-board.  The house was built in 1908 by T. S. Ellas, a prominent local builder, for his own family.  In 1948 it was acquired by R. J. McKay, a prominent local civic leader.

The house was listed on the National Register of Historic Places in 1978.

See also
National Register of Historic Places listings in Monroe County, Arkansas

References

Houses on the National Register of Historic Places in Arkansas
Queen Anne architecture in Arkansas
Houses completed in 1908
Houses in Monroe County, Arkansas
National Register of Historic Places in Monroe County, Arkansas
1908 establishments in Arkansas